A list of Portuguese films that were first released in 2007.

See also
2007 in Portugal

References

2007
Lists of 2007 films by country or language
2007 in Portugal